John James Rudd (25 October 1919 – 8 December 1985) was an Irish footballer born in Dublin, Ireland.

External links
Jimmy Rudd at leeds-fans.org.uk

1919 births
Association footballers from Dublin (city)
1985 deaths
Republic of Ireland association footballers
Association football midfielders
Manchester City F.C. players
York City F.C. players
Leeds United F.C. players
Rotherham United F.C. players
Scunthorpe United F.C. players
Workington A.F.C. players